Allan Alemán Avila (born 29 July 1983 in San José, Costa Rica) is a retired Costa Rican professional football.

Club career
Alemán made his professional debut with Deportivo Saprissa where he was known for his hard work on the field, his quickness, scoring skills and most of all his talent for creating assists.

With Saprissa he won two national championships, as well as an UNCAF Cup title and a CONCACAF Champions Cup title. After the Clausura 2007 tournament, he signed with Italian businessman Matteo Quintavalle, which meant his departure from the team, seeing as Quintavalle is not a FIFA-licensed player's agent, and Saprissa would not negotiate with him. Quintavalle was accused of fraud, and Alemán left Quintavalle (after a breach of contract by Quintavalle), and signed with Puntarenas F.C. on his own. 5 days before the transfer window closed, Aleman signed with Liberia Mia, but was allowed to play 2 more matches with Puntarenas against Saprissa, one of them for the UNCAF Cup Semifinals. Later he signed with  Brujas but in January 2010, he returned to Saprissa. Alemán participated in the 2005 FIFA Club World Championship Toyota Cup with his team, who ended up in third place, behind São Paulo Futebol Clube and Liverpool F.C.

On 23 July 2014, Alemán transferred to China League One side Xinjiang Tianshan Leopard.

Abroad
In the 2012 Allan decided to go to the Xelajú in Guatemala who were managed by compatriot Hernán Medford. In summer 2013 he moved to Honduran football, joining Medford's new club Real España.

International career
Alemán has made ten appearances for the senior Costa Rica national football team, his debut coming in a friendly against Chile on 2 June 2007. He appeared in two matches for Costa Rica at the 2007 CONCACAF Gold Cup.

References

External links
 
 Allan Alemán at Footballdatabase

1983 births
Living people
Footballers from San José, Costa Rica
Association football wingers
Costa Rican men's footballers
Costa Rica international footballers
2007 CONCACAF Gold Cup players
Deportivo Saprissa players
China League One players
Xinjiang Tianshan Leopard F.C. players
Puntarenas F.C. players
Municipal Liberia footballers
Brujas FC players
Xelajú MC players
Real C.D. España players
Municipal Grecia players
Costa Rican expatriate footballers
Expatriate footballers in Guatemala
Expatriate footballers in Honduras
Expatriate footballers in China
Costa Rican expatriate sportspeople in Guatemala
Costa Rican expatriate sportspeople in Honduras
Costa Rican expatriate sportspeople in China